Karin Marjolein Lasthuizen (born 1970) is a Dutch-New Zealand academic. As of 2022, she holds the Brian Picot Chair in Ethical Leadership at the Victoria University of Wellington.

Academic career

After an undergraduate at Radboud University Nijmegen, Lasthuizen did a 2008 PhD at VU University Amsterdam titled  'Leading to integrity : empirical research into the effects of leadership on ethics and integrity.'  She then lectured at VU University Amsterdam and was a city counciler for the   Labour Party before moving to Wellington, New Zealand in 2016 to take up the Brian Picot Chair in Ethical Leadership at the Victoria University of Wellington.

Lasthuizen's research focus on public-sector ethics and leadership.

Selected works 
 Van der Wal, Zeger, Gjalt De Graaf, and Karin Lasthuizen. "What’s valued most? Similarities and differences between the organizational values of the public and private sector." Public administration 86, no. 2 (2008): 465–482.
 Huberts, Leo WJC, Muel Kaptein, and Karin Lasthuizen. "A study of the impact of three leadership styles on integrity violations committed by police officers." Policing: An International Journal of Police Strategies & Management 30, no. 4 (2007): 587–607.
 Lasthuizen, Karin M. "Leading to integrity: Empirical research into the effects of leadership on ethics and integrity." (2008).
 Akker, L. V., Leonie Heres, Karin Lasthuizen, and F. E. Six. "Ethical leadership and trust: It's all about meeting expectations." (2009).
 Kaptein, Muel, Leo Huberts, Scott Avelino, and Karin Lasthuizen. "Demonstrating ethical leadership by measuring ethics: A survey of US public servants." Public Integrity 7, no. 4 (2005): 299–311.

References

External links
  
 
 

Living people
New Zealand women academics
Vrije Universiteit Amsterdam alumni
Academic staff of Vrije Universiteit Amsterdam
Radboud University Nijmegen alumni
Dutch emigrants to New Zealand
1970 births
Academic staff of the Victoria University of Wellington
New Zealand women writers